Striosubulina striatella is a species of small air-breathing land snail, a terrestrial pulmonate gastropod mollusk in the family Achatinidae.

Distribution
This species is native to tropical West Africa. It is introduced in the Mascarene Islands: (Réunion, Mauritius, Rodrigues).

References 

 Rowson, B., Warren, B.H. & Ngereza, C.F. (2010). Terrestrial molluscs of Pemba Island, Zanzibar, Tanzania, and its status as an “oceanic” island. ZooKeys 70: 1–39. 

Subulininae
Gastropods described in 1831